Nanook Dome is a lava dome in northwestern British Columbia, Canada, located just northeast of Mount Edziza in Mount Edziza Provincial Park. It last erupted during the Pleistocene epoch.

See also
List of volcanoes in Canada
List of Northern Cordilleran volcanoes
Volcanism of Canada
Volcanism of Western Canada

References

External links

Mount Edziza volcanic complex
Pleistocene lava domes
Two-thousanders of British Columbia